The Spanish Rally Championship is the most important rally championship in Spain. It was established in 1956.

Champions 

Driver Championship

External links

Rally
Rally racing series
Articles containing video clips